Alanne is a Finnish surname. Notable people with the surname include:

 Joonas Alanne (born 1990), Finnish hockey player
 Mikko Alanne (born 1972), Finnish screenwriter of The 33 (film) and other films
 Outi Alanne (born 1967), Finnish poet
 Severi Alanne (1879-1960), Finnish-American political activist and journalist
 Timo Alanne, Finnish racing driver

Finnish-language surnames